UFC 117: Silva vs. Sonnen was a mixed martial arts event held by the Ultimate Fighting Championship on August 7, 2010 at the Oracle Arena in Oakland, California, United States.

Background
UFC President Dana White announced via ESPN on Jim Rome is Burning that Middleweight Champion Anderson Silva would face Chael Sonnen on August 7.

White threatened to cut Silva from the UFC if he fought the same way he did in his previous bout in Abu Dhabi at UFC 112. "I'm telling you right now, if he acts like that again in the ring, I will cut him," said White. "I don't care if he's the pound for pound best fighter in the world. I don't care if he's the middleweight champion."

A bout between Joey Beltran and Matt Mitrione was reported to be in the works. The fight was later moved to UFC 119.

Stanislav Nedkov was scheduled to make his UFC debut against Rodney Wallace, but was replaced by Phil Davis after sustaining an injury.

Thiago Silva was scheduled to face Tim Boetsch, but was forced off the card with an aggravated back injury. Silva's replacement was Todd Brown.

Dana White confirmed that the winner of the Fitch vs. Alves fight would receive a title shot.

The Fitch/Alves fight was changed to catchweight status after Alves weighed in at 171.5 lb; 0.5 lb over the 171 lb welterweight limit for non title fights. Alves was fined 20% of his purse.

Results

Bonus awards
Fighters were awarded $60,000 bonuses.

Fight of the Night: Anderson Silva vs. Chael Sonnen
Knockout of the Night: Stefan Struve
Submission of the Night: Matt Hughes

Reported payout
The following is the reported payout to the fighters as reported to the California State Athletic Commission. It does not include sponsor money or "locker room" bonuses often given by the UFC and also do not include the UFC's traditional "fight night" bonuses.

Anderson Silva $200,000 (no win bonus) def. Chael Sonnen $35,000
Jon Fitch $108,000 ($54,000 win bonus) def. Thiago Alves $60,000
Clay Guida $56,000 ($28,000 win bonus) def. Rafael dos Anjos $12,000
Matt Hughes $200,000 ($100,000 win bonus) def. Ricardo Almeida $35,000
Junior dos Santos $80,000 ($40,000 win bonus) def. Roy Nelson $15,000
Rick Story $22,000 ($11,000 win bonus) def. Dustin Hazlett $18,000
Phil Davis $18,000 ($9,000 win bonus) def. Rodney Wallace $6,000
Johny Hendricks $40,000 ($20,000 win bonus) def. Charlie Brenneman $8,000
Tim Boetsch $32,000 ($16,000 win bonus) def. Todd Brown $6,000
Stefan Struve $30,000 ($15,000 win bonus) def. Christian Morecraft $8,000
Dennis Hallman $30,000 ($15,000 win bonus) def. Ben Saunders $12,000

^ Thiago Alves was reportedly fined 20 percent of his purse for failing to make the 170-pound welterweight limit. The CSAC's initial report did not include information on the penalty.

References

See also
 Ultimate Fighting Championship
 List of UFC champions
 List of UFC events
 2010 in UFC

Ultimate Fighting Championship events
2010 in mixed martial arts
Mixed martial arts in California
Sports competitions in Oakland, California
2010 in sports in California